Jeff Bleamer (born June 22, 1953) is a former American football tackle and guard. He played for the Philadelphia Eagles from 1975 to 1976 and for the New York Jets in 1977.

References

1953 births
Living people
American football offensive tackles
American football offensive guards
Penn State Nittany Lions football players
Philadelphia Eagles players
New York Jets players
Colorado Buffaloes football coaches
The Citadel Bulldogs football coaches
East Tennessee State Buccaneers football coaches
Ohio Bobcats football coaches
Hamilton Tiger-Cats coaches
Edmonton Elks coaches
Louis E. Dieruff High School alumni